The 1989 London Marathon was the ninth running of the annual marathon race in London, United Kingdom, which took place on Sunday, 23 April. The elite men's race was won by Kenya's Douglas Wakiihuri in a time of 2:09:03 hours and the women's race was won by home athlete Véronique Marot in 2:25:56. Marot's time was a British national record, which stood for 13 years before Paula Radcliffe improved it with a world record at the 2002 London Marathon.

In the wheelchair races, British athletes David Holding (1:59:31) and Josie Cichockyj (3:03:54) won the men's and women's divisions, respectively. This was the first time an athlete completed the wheelchair marathon in under two hours.

Around 72,000 people applied to enter the race, of which 31,772 had their applications accepted and 24,452 started the race. A total of 22,701 runners finished the race.

Results

Men

Women

Wheelchair men

Wheelchair women

References

Results
Results. Association of Road Racing Statisticians. Retrieved 2020-04-23.

External links

Official website

1989
London Marathon
Marathon
London Marathon